Tyssestrengene are waterfalls east of the village of Tyssedal in Ullensvang Municipality, in Vestland county, Norway.  The waterfalls are fed by the Tysso River before flowing down into the lake Ringedalsvatnet.  The Trolltunga cliff is located near the waterfalls.

Following their incorporation in the Norwegian Hydroelectric Power Authority, their water flow is diminished to such a point that only after heavy snow melts is there any flow of substance. Most of the year there is no water flowing. However, they are amongst the highest waterfalls in the world and, according to Statistics Norway, the tallest single drop in Norway.

References

Tiered waterfalls
Ullensvang
Waterfalls of Vestland